Simon Jensen (born February 3, 1973) is a Danish jazz flutist, composer and poet. He is active in several genres and leads his own band, Simon Jensen Band. He lives in Gothenburg, Sweden.

Jensen was born in Copenhagen, the son of artist Steen Krarup Jensen. Between 1997 and 2002, he was a permanent member of the Swedish prog rock band Grovjobb, and this band made three albums during that period. In January 2005 the album All You Can Eat with Simon Jensen Band was released on Blue Beat Productions.

Jensen made his literary debut in 2009 with a collection of poems called Skärmen (in Swedish). In December 2011, his second collection of poems, Fingret, was published.

Bibliography 
 Skärmen,  (Trombone, 2009)
 Fingret,  (Trombone, 2011)
 C++ på riktigt,  (Göteborgs Tekniska College, 2019)

Discography 
 Landet Leverpastej, Grovjobb (Garageland Records, 1998)
 Vättarnas Fest, Grovjobb (Garageland Records, 2000)
 Under Solen Lyser Solen, Grovjobb (Garageland Records, 2002)
 All You Can Eat, Simon Jensen Band (Blue Beat Productions, 2005)
 Eileen Live at FolkFest July 2010, Eileen (Eileen Events, 2010)

Other works 
 The dice game Inverted Dice (OffCircle, 2015)

References

Sources 
 Simon Jensen's Official website
 Review off the album All You Can Eat
 Review of Skärmen (in Swedish)

Danish composers
Male composers
Swedish-language writers
Swedish-language poets
1973 births
Living people
21st-century Danish musicians
21st-century male musicians